National Destourian Initiative or El Moubadra was a centrist political party in Tunisia that merged into Long Live Tunisia in 2019. Emerging from the Constitutional Democratic Rally (RCD) of ousted president Ben Ali, it was formed after the Tunisian revolution on 1 April 2011.

The party was led by Kamel Morjane, former Defence and Foreign Minister under Ben Ali. The party assertively supported the representation of former RCD members in post-revolutionary politics.

After the Party of Freedom for Justice and Development, the Party of Independence, the Party of Tomorrow's Tunisia and the Party of Third Path merged into The Initiative on 30 July 2014, the party openly presented itself as the National Destourian Initiative.

References

External links
 (in Arabic)

2011 establishments in Tunisia
2019 disestablishments in Tunisia
Centrist parties in Tunisia
Defunct political parties in Tunisia
Destourian parties
Political parties disestablished in 2019
Political parties established in 2011